Fabio Caduff (born 12 September 1985 in Cumbel) is a Swiss snowboarder. He placed 13th in the men's snowboard cross event at the 2010 Winter Olympics.

References

1985 births
Living people
Romansh people
Swiss male snowboarders
Olympic snowboarders of Switzerland
Snowboarders at the 2010 Winter Olympics
Sportspeople from Graubünden